Fan Yifei (born August 1964) is a former Chinese banker who served as vice governor of the People's Bank of China from 2015 to 2022. He was investigated by China's top anti-graft agency in November 2022. Fan was the first ministerial-level official in China to be targeted by China's top anticorruption watchdog since the 20th National Congress of the Chinese Communist Party in October 2022.

Early life and education 
In August 1964, Fan was born in Taixing County (now Taixing), Jiangsu, and graduated from the Renmin University of China. From March 2001 to October 2002, he pursued advanced studies in the United States, earning a master's degree in international economics from Columbia University.

Career 
Starting in July 1982, he served in several posts in the China Construction Bank, including assistant to general manager of its Trust and Investment Company, deputy director of the Capital Planning Department, general manager of the Finance and Accounting Department, and general manager of the Planning and Finance Department. He moved up the ranks to become assistant president in February 2000 and vice president in June 2005. He joined the Chinese Communist Party (CCP) in June 1991.

He was deputy general manager of the China Investment Corporation in March 2010, in addition to serving as chairman of the Bank of Shanghai since November 2011.

In February 2015, he was appointed vice governor of the People's Bank of China, a position at vice-ministerial level.

Investigation 
On 5 November 2022, he was put under investigation for alleged "serious violations of discipline and laws" by the Central Commission for Discipline Inspection (CCDI), the party's internal disciplinary body, and the National Supervisory Commission, the highest anti-corruption agency of China.

References 

1964 births
Living people
People from Taixing
Renmin University of China alumni
Columbia Graduate School of Arts and Sciences alumni
Chinese bankers
Chinese Communist Party politicians from Jiangsu